The Booth-Weir House is a historic house on West First Street in McRae, Arkansas.  It is a single-story wood-frame structure, with an irregular cross-gable configuration and a projecting gable-roof porch.  It is finished in composition shingles and rests on brick piers.  Built in 1911 for a railroad fireman, it is one of a few houses in McRae to survive the pre-World War I period, and is typical of vernacular construction of that period.

The house was listed on the National Register of Historic Places in 1991.

See also
National Register of Historic Places listings in White County, Arkansas

References

Houses on the National Register of Historic Places in Arkansas
Houses in White County, Arkansas
National Register of Historic Places in White County, Arkansas
Houses completed in 1911
1911 establishments in Arkansas